Nathaniel James Dusing (born November 25, 1978) is an American former competition swimmer, Olympic medalist, and world champion.

Education
Dusing won six swimming state championships for Covington Catholic High School before graduating in 1997. The later swam for the University of Texas.

Swimming
Dusing represented the United States at two consecutive Summer Olympics.  At the 2000 Summer Olympics in Sydney, Australia, he earned a silver medal by swimming for the second-place U.S. team in the preliminary heats of the men's 4×200-meter freestyle relay.  Four years later, at the 2004 Summer Olympics in Athens, Greece, he received a bronze medal by swimming for the third-place U.S. team in the preliminary heats of the men's 4×100-meter freestyle relay.

He was also a member of gold medal-winning U.S. relay teams in the 4×100-meter freestyle at the 2005 World Aquatics Championships, and the 2004 World Short Course Championships.

See also
 List of Olympic medalists in swimming (men)
 List of University of Texas at Austin alumni
 List of World Aquatics Championships medalists in swimming (men)

References

External links
 
 
 
 

1978 births
Living people
American male freestyle swimmers
Medalists at the FINA World Swimming Championships (25 m)
Olympic bronze medalists for the United States in swimming
Olympic silver medalists for the United States in swimming
Sportspeople from the Cincinnati metropolitan area
People from Kenton County, Kentucky
Swimmers at the 2000 Summer Olympics
Swimmers at the 2004 Summer Olympics
Texas Longhorns men's swimmers
World Aquatics Championships medalists in swimming
Medalists at the 2004 Summer Olympics
Medalists at the 2000 Summer Olympics
Covington Catholic High School alumni
Swimmers from Kentucky
20th-century American people
21st-century American people